Richard Schwartz may refer to:

 Richard Schwartz (mathematician) (born 1966), American mathematician
 Richard H. Schwartz (born 1934), vegetarian and animal rights activist
 Richard Schwartz (bridge) (1943–2019), American bridge player
 Richard D. Schwartz (c. 1925–2017), American lawyer
 Rick Schwartz (born 1967), American film and television producer
 Richard Schwartz (politician) (born c. 1959), New York politician and businessperson
 Richard Schwartz (engineer), American aerospace engineer

See also
 Richard Schwarz (1890–?), German-Russian track and field athlete